My Native Land may refer to:

 "My Native Land" (poem), written by Dashdorjiin Natsagdorj (1906–1937)
 My Native Land (film), 1980